Kristian Kushta (born 19 December 1997) is an Albanian professional footballer who plays as a forward for Greek Super League 2 club Iraklis.

Club career

Early career
Kushta was born in Albania but moved to Greece when he was very young and started his youth career with PAOK FC at age of just 5.

PAOK
He made it his first professional debut under the coach Igor Tudor on 17 December 2015 in a 2015–16 Greek Football Cup match against Olympiacos Volou coming on as a substitute in the 46th minute in place of Nikos Syrakos, where the match finished in the 1–1 away draw.

International career
Kushta participated with Albania national under-17 football team in the 2014 UEFA European Under-17 Championship qualifying round in October 2013 under the coach Dzemal Mustedanagić where he managed to appear in all 3 group matches, playing as a substitute in the opening match against Romania U17 replacing Franc Bakalli, then two other matches as a starter to help his side to advance in the next elite round.

Personal life
His uncle is the former player Sokol Kushta.

Career statistics

Club

References

External links

Kristian Kushta profile PAOKFC

1997 births
Living people
Footballers from Vlorë
Albanian footballers
Albanian emigrants to Greece
Association football forwards
Albania youth international footballers
PAOK FC players
MFK Zemplín Michalovce players
FK Slavoj Trebišov players
Aiginiakos F.C. players
A.E. Karaiskakis F.C. players
O.F. Ierapetra F.C. players
Athlitiki Enosi Larissa F.C. players
Slovak Super Liga players
2. Liga (Slovakia) players
Super League Greece players
Football League (Greece) players
Super League Greece 2 players
Albanian expatriate footballers
Albanian expatriate sportspeople in Greece
Expatriate footballers in Greece
Albanian expatriate sportspeople in Slovakia
Expatriate footballers in Slovakia